Intercession of the Saints is a Christian doctrine held by the Eastern Orthodox, Oriental Orthodox, Assyrian Church of the East and Catholic churches, and some Anglicans. The practice of praying through saints can be found in Christian writings from the 3rd century onward.
The 4th-century Apostles' Creed states belief in the communion of Saints, which certain Christian churches interpret as supporting the intercession of saints. However, similar practices are controversial in Judaism, Islam, and Protestantism.

Biblical basis

Intercession of the living for the living
According to the Epistle to the Romans, the living can intercede for the living:

"Now I (Paul) beseech you, brethren, for the Lord Jesus Christ's sake, and for the love of the Spirit, that ye strive together with me in your prayers to God for me" (Romans 15:30).

Mary intercedes at the wedding at Cana and occasions Jesus's first miracle. "On the third day a wedding took place at Cana in Galilee. Jesus’ mother was there, and Jesus and his disciples had also been invited to the wedding. When the wine was gone, Jesus’ mother said to him, 'They have no more wine.' 'Woman, why do you involve me?' Jesus replied. 'My hour has not yet come.' His mother said to the servants, 'Do whatever he tells you'” (John 2:1–5).

When God was displeased by the four men who had attempted to give advice to the patriarch Job, he said to them, "My servant Job will pray for you, and I will accept his prayer and not deal with you according to your folly" (Job 42:8).

Moses says to God, "'Forgive the sin of these people, just as you have pardoned them from the time they left Egypt until now.' The Lord replied, 'I have forgiven them, as you asked'" (Numbers 14:19–20). 

The elders of the church can intercede for the sick people. "Is anyone among you sick? Let them call the elders of the church to pray over them and anoint them with oil in the name of the Lord. And the prayer offered in faith will make the sick person well; the Lord will raise them up. If they have sinned, they will be forgiven" (James 5:14–15).

Intercession of the living for the dead

Some interpret 2 Timothy 1:16–18 to support prayer for the dead: "The Lord give mercy unto the house of Onesiphorus; for he oft refreshed me, and was not ashamed of my chain: But, when he was in Rome, he sought me out very diligently, and found me. The Lord grant unto him that he may find mercy of the Lord in that day: and in how many things he ministered unto me at Ephesus, thou knowest very well."

The deuterocanonical book 2 Maccabees 12:43–46 speaks explicitly about the prayer of the living for the dead: "And making a gathering, he sent twelve thousand drachms of silver to Jerusalem for sacrifice to be offered for the sins of the dead, thinking well and religiously concerning the resurrection, (For if he had not hoped that they that were slain should rise again, it would have seemed superfluous and vain to pray for the dead,) And because he considered that they who had fallen asleep with godliness, had great grace laid up for them. It is therefore a holy and wholesome thought to pray for the dead, that they may be loosed from sins."

Intercession of the dead for the living
Early Christians derived some of their views from Judaism. "[A]t least some Jews in the first century believed that the angels in heaven were praying for those on earth and presenting their prayers to God. Those in heaven—Onias, Jeremiah, and the angels—were intimately involved in what was happening on earth." In Luke 15:7 Jesus says that those in heaven rejoice when a sinner repents. In Hebrews 12:1, the author refers to them as a "cloud of witnesses". According to Fr. Lawrence, "It was part of the Church’s faith in the first century that those in heaven interceded for those on earth." 

Aquinas quotes Revelation 8:4: "And the smoke of the incense of the prayers of the saints ascended up before God from the hand of the angel."

Both those for and against the intercession of saints quote Job 5:1: "Call if you will, but who will answer you? To which of the holy ones will you turn?".

Jesus' parable of the rich man and Lazarus in Luke 16:19–31 indicates the ability of the dead to pray for the living. The intercession of the dead for the living is shown in 2 Maccabees 15:14–17; an intercession on behalf of Israel by the late high priest Onias III plus that of Jeremiah, the prophet who died almost 400 years earlier. "And Onias spoke, saying, 'This is a man who loves the brethren and prays much for the people and the holy city, Jeremiah, the prophet of God.

Catholic view 

Catholic Church doctrine supports intercessory prayer to saints. This practice is an application of the Catholic doctrine of the Communion of Saints. Some of the early basis for this was the belief that martyrs passed immediately into the presence of God and could obtain graces and blessings for others. A further reinforcement was derived from the cult of the angels which, while pre-Christian in its origin, was heartily embraced by the faithful of the sub-Apostolic age.

Gregory of Nazianzus said of his deceased father: "I am well assured that his intercession is of more avail now than was his instruction in former days, since he is closer to God, now that he has shaken off his bodily fetters, and freed his mind from the clay which obscured it"; and Jerome wrote: "If the Apostles and Martyrs, while still in the body, can pray for others, at a time when they must still be anxious for themselves, how much more after their crowns, victories, and triumphs are won!"

The Catholic doctrine of intercession and invocation was set forth by the Council of Trent, which teaches that "...the saints who reign together with Christ offer up their own prayers to God for men. It is good and useful suppliantly to invoke them, and to have recourse to their prayers, aid, and help for obtaining benefits from God, through His Son Jesus Christ our Lord, Who alone is our Redeemer and Saviour."

Intercessory prayer to saintly persons who have not yet been canonized is also practiced, and evidence of miracles produced as a result of such prayer is very commonly produced during the formal process of beatification and canonization.

According to the Catechism of the Catholic Church:

Some Catholic scholars have reinterpreted invocation and intercession of the saints with a critical view toward the medieval tendencies of imagining the saints in heaven distributing favors to whom they will and instead seeing in proper devotion to the saints a means of response to God’s activity in us through these creative models of Christ-likeness.

In ecumenical conversations agreement has been reached that "asking the saints to intercede for us expresses the solidarity of the church wherein all are meant to be of mutual support to one another. Analogous to what is done among living persons, the request directed toward a saint to pray for us is a precise expression of solidarity in Jesus Christ, through the ages and across various modes of human existence."

Intercessory prayer to saints also plays an important role in the Eastern and Oriental Orthodox  churches such as the Coptic Orthodox Church. In addition, some Anglo-Catholics believe in saintly intercession.

Protestant views 
With the exception of a few early Protestant churches, most modern Protestant churches strongly reject the intercession of the dead for the living, but they are in favor of the intercession of the living for the living according to Romans 15:30.

Lutheran views 

The Lutheran confessions approve honoring the saints by thanking God for examples of his mercy, by using the saints as examples for strengthening the believers' faith, and by imitating their faith and other virtues. Although the Augsburg Confession rejects invoking the saints to ask for their help, it affirms that "they pray for the Church universal in general" in life and in heaven. The Augsburg Confession therefore emphasizes that Christ is the only mediator between God and man, and that he is the one to whom Christians ought to pray. Though most Lutheran denominations do not, the Evangelical Community Church-Lutheran—a Lutheran denomination with Evangelical Catholic churchmanship—affirmed a belief in the intercession of saints.

With regard to the Virgin Mary specifically, Martin Luther advocated the use of the pre-Council of Trent version of the Hail Mary (that is, "Hail Mary, full of grace, the Lord is with thee. Blessed art thou among women and blessed is the fruit of thy womb, Jesus.") as a sign of reverence for and devotion to her. The 1522 Betbüchlein (Prayer Book) of Lutheranism thus retained the Ave Maria.

Anglican views 
The first Anglican articles of faith, the Ten Articles (1536), defended the practice of praying to saints, while the King's Book, the official statement of religion produced in 1543, devotes an entire section to the importance of the Ave Maria ("Hail Mary") prayer. However, the Thirty-nine Articles (1563) condemn "invocation of saints" as "a fond thing, vainly invented, and grounded upon no warranty of Scripture, but rather repugnant to the Word of God" (Article XXII).

Theologians within the Anglican Communion make a clear distinction between a "Romish" doctrine concerning the invocation of saints and what they view as the "Patristic" doctrine of intercession of the saints, permitting the latter, but forbidding the former. The bishop William Forbes termed the Anglican practice advocation of the saints, meaning "asking for the saints to pray with them and on their behalf, not praying to them".

Calvinist views 

Like Lutherans, strict Calvinists understand the "communion of saints" mentioned in the Apostles' Creed to consist of all believers, including those who have died, but invocation of departed saints is regarded as a transgression of the First Commandment.

Methodist views 
Article XIV of the Methodist Articles of Religion from 1784, echoing the Anglican Thirty-nine Articles, rejects invocation of saints by declaring the doctrine "a fond thing, vainly invented, and grounded upon no warrant of Scripture, but rather repugnant to the Word of God".

Parallels in other religions

Judaism 
There is evidence of a Jewish belief in intercession, both in the form of the paternal blessings passed down from Abraham to his children, and 2 Maccabees, where Judas Maccabaeus sees the dead Onias and Jeremiah giving blessing to the Jewish army. In ancient Judaism, it was also popular to pray for intercession from Michael in spite of the rabbinical prohibition against appealing to angels as intermediaries between God and his people. There were two prayers written beseeching him as the prince of mercy to intercede in favor of Israel: one composed by Eliezer ha-Kalir, and the other by Judah ben Samuel he-Hasid. Those who oppose this practice feel that to God alone may prayers be offered.

In modern times, one of the greatest divisions in Jewish theology (hashkafa) is over the issue of whether one can beseech the help of a tzadik – an extremely righteous individual.  The main conflict is over a practice of beseeching a tzadik who has already died to make intercession before the Almighty. This practice is common mainly among Chasidic Jews, but also found in varying degrees among other usually Chareidi communities.  It strongest opposition is found largely among sectors of Modern Orthodox Judaism, Dor Daim and Talmide haRambam, and among aspects of the Litvish Chareidi community.  Those who oppose this practice usually do so over the problem of idolatry, as Jewish Law strictly prohibits making use of a mediator (melitz) or agent (sarsur) between oneself and the Almighty.

The perspectives of those Jewish groups opposed to the use of intercessors is usually softer in regard to beseeching the Almighty alone merely in the "merit" (tzechut) of a tzadik.

Those Jews who support the use of intercessors claim that their beseeching of the tzadik is not prayer or worship, or alternatively that they are still praying to God and through God, but secondarily communicating with the tzadik.  The conflict between the groups is essentially over what constitutes prayer, worship, a mediator (melitz), and an agent (sarsur).

Islam 

Tawassul is the practice of using someone as a means or an intermediary in a supplication directed towards God. An example of this would be such: "O my Lord, help me with [such and such need] due to the love I have for Your Prophet."

Some Shi'a practice seeking intercession from saints, in particular from Muhammad's son-in-law, Ali and Ali's son, Husayn. A well-known Persian Shi'a hymn reads "" ("It is not strange that man, through servitude to 'Ali, will reach God").

Mandaeism 
The names of uthras (celestial beings in the World of Light) in Mandaean prayers, such as the canonical prayers of the Qolasta. Some of these prayers, such as the Asiet Malkia (Qolasta prayer 105) and Ṭabahatan prayer (Qolasta prayer 170), have long lists of ancestors, uthras, and prophets such as Adam and John the Baptist.

Serer religion 

In the religion of the Serer people of Senegal, the Gambia and Mauritania, some of their ancient dead are taken as, in an analogy,  holy saints, called Pangool in the Serer language.  These ancient ancestors act as interceders between the living world and their supreme deity Roog.

See also
 Efficacy of prayer
 Intercession of Christ
 Intercession of the Spirit
 Intercession of the Theotokos
 Patron saint
 Shrine
 Slava (patron saint day)
 Veneration

Notes

References

External links 
 Church Fathers on the Intercession of the Saints 
 Marian Prayers and Prayers of the Saints
 Marian Novenas and Novenas to Saints 
 Index and Calendar of Saints 
 Salatul Istisqa, Islamic prayer for rain ceremony
 The performance of the Salatul Istisqa, the Islamic prayer for rain, in the parched bed of the Goulburn River in Denman, in the Hunter Valley, Sydney, Australia, 2003.
 Hadith Proofs for Tawassul through the Prophet

Christian worship and liturgy
Christian terminology
Sainthood
Shia Islam